Ear Candy may refer to:

Ear Candy (King's X album), 1996
Ear Candy (Helen Reddy album), 1977